Tambuco is a Mexican contemporary classical percussion group which has been nominated three times for awards including Best Classical Album. It was founded in 1993. The group consists of four percussionists: Ricardo Gallardo, Alfredo Bringas, Raúl Tudón and Miguel González. Their name comes from Carlos Chávez's work Tambuco for percussion ensemble.

Tambuco has played on three continents, has received many awards worldwide, and has collaborated with composers such as Keiko Abe, Glen Vélez, Michael Nyman, Steward Copeland, Valerie Naranjo, Robert Van Sice, Celso Machado, Enrique Diemecke and Eduardo Mata, who worked with Tambuco to record the percussion works of Carlos Chávez for Dorian Recordings label.

Tambuco has a repertoire ranging from structuralist percussion music to a wide range of ethnic drum music and avant garde.

The soundtrack for the 2015 James Bond film Spectre also features a performance by Tambuco in the opening track, "Los Muertos Vivos Estan".

Further reading
Del Río, Fanny. 1999. "Entrevista al grupo Tambuco". Pauta: Cuadernos de teoría y crítica musical 17, no. 70: (April–June): 19–26.

External links
 Official Website

Mexican musical groups
Contemporary classical music ensembles